“Wanyu” may refer to:

Places
Wanyu, Huarong (万庾镇), a town of Huarong County, Hunan, China.

tree
Acacia ramulosa var. linophylla, sometimes as wanyu, is a tree in the family Fabaceae.